Tony Bisignano (born May 14, 1952) is an American politician and state senator from the state of Iowa.

Bisignano first served in the Iowa House from 1987 to 1993, and then in the Senate from 1993 to 1997. He was reelected in 2014.

Biography
Tony Bisignano was born in Des Moines, Iowa to Alfonso and Rose Bisignano.

He graduated from Dowling High School in 1970. Bisignano then attended the University of Northern Iowa and Grandview College. Bisignano attended Drake University in Des Moines.

Bisignano served worked in various jobs for Polk County, Iowa and was president of AFSCME Local 1868, eventually becoming a project manager for the Polk County Board of Supervisors. He is a member of the Italian/American Cultural Center and is a past board member of Big Brothers and Big Sisters of Greater Des Moines.

Iowa House
Bisignano served in the Iowa House representing the 80th district from 1987 until 1993 when he was elected to the Senate.

Iowa Senate

Bisignano served in the Iowa Senate representing the 34th district from 1993 until 1997.

Bisignano ran for the Iowa Senate again in 2014 and was elected to represent the 17th district. He serves as the chairman of the Labor and Business Relations Committee.

Personal life
Bisignano is married to Kimberly Caudill. They have two daughters, Emily and Allison. Their son Nick was killed in an auto accident.

Bisignano is a Roman Catholic and worships at St. Anthony's Catholic Church.

References

1952 births
Living people
Democratic Party Iowa state senators
Democratic Party members of the Iowa House of Representatives
Drake University alumni
University of Northern Iowa alumni
21st-century American politicians
American Federation of State, County and Municipal Employees people